Education  in Botswana is provided by public schools and private schools. Education in Botswana is governed by the Ministries of Basic Education. and Tertiary, Research Science and Technology Among sub-Saharan African countries, Botswana has one of the highest literacy rates. According to The World Factbook - Central Intelligence Agency as of 2015, 88.5% of the population age 15 and over can read and write in Botswana were respectively literate.

The Private schools are generally free to determine their own curriculum and staffing policies, with voluntary accreditation available through independent regional accreditation authorities. About 87% of school-age children attend public schools, about 10% attend private schools while roughly 3% are home-schooled.

Education is compulsory over an age range starting between five and eight and ending somewhere between ages sixteen and eighteen. This requirement can be satisfied in public schools, state-certified private schools, or an approved home school program.

Secondary education in Botswana is neither free nor compulsory. In 2002, the gross primary enrollment rate was 103 percent, and the net primary enrollment rate was 81 percent. Gross and net enrollment ratios are based on the number of students formally registered in primary school and therefore do not necessarily reflect school attendance. Recent primary school attendance statistics are not available for Botswana. As of 2001, 86 percent of children who started primary school were likely to reach grade 5. In Botswana's education system, girls and boys have equal access to education. Girls are likely to drop out of secondary school due to pregnancy.

Post-secondary education, divided into college, as the first tertiary degree, and graduate school, is described in a separate section below.

Botswana made great strides in educational development after independence in 1966. At that time there were very few graduates in the country and very few Batswana attended secondary school. With the discovery of diamonds just after independence and the increase in government revenue that this brought, there was a huge increase in educational provision in the country. All students were guaranteed ten years of basic education, leading to a Junior Certificate qualification. Approximately half of the school population attends a further two years of secondary schooling leading to the award of the Botswana General Certificate of Education. After leaving school, students can attend one of the seven technical colleges in the country, or take vocational training courses in teaching or nursing. The best students enter the University of Botswana, Botswana University of Agriculture and Natural Resources, and The Botswana Accountancy College in Gaborone. A larger influx of tertiary students is expected when construction of the nation's second national university, The Botswana International University of Science and Technology, is completed. Many other students end up in the numerous private tertiary education colleges around the country. A high majority of these students are government sponsored. The quantitative gains have not always been matched by qualitative ones. Primary schools in particular still lack resources, and the teachers are less well paid than their secondary school colleagues. In January 2006, Botswana announced the reintroduction of school fees after two decades of free state education.

Total government expenditure on education as percentage of GDP in Botswana was reported to be 9.633% in 2009, the highest among Sub-Saharan African countries.

Education stages

Preschool 
Preschool encompasses non-compulsory classroom-based early-childhood education prior to the age of five to six. Issues of Early Childhood Care and education were incorporated into the Revised National Policy on Education (RNPE) of 1994.The responsibility to provide early childhood education  programs lies largely with the private and civil society sectors rather than with the government. The practices of providers of early childhood education are either simply "business opportunity seeking" responses to the new consumption patterns of more affluent parent (or guardian) or current global trends of child education preparation. Many community-based programs, commercial enterprises, non-profit organizations, faith communities, and independent childcare providers offer preschool education. Preschool may be general or may have a particular focus, such as arts education, religious education, sports training, or foreign language learning, along with providing general education.The benefit of pre-primary education cannot be over-emphasized because children develop cognitively and socially.

Botswana government as of 2015 has started opening early childhood education programs in many governmental primary schools in order to promote the education of young children. This started by opening a half-year pre-school class after the standard 7 students had finished writing their final exams. Their classrooms would be unoccupied for the rest of the academic year, so this way they could accommodate the 5-year-old children. Proceeding that, the government is now implementing a two-year program for children aged 4 and 5 years old. Moreover, government of Botswana also paying more attention to early childhood education.

Primary Education 
Primary education ranges from reception (pre-standard one) up to standard 7.

Children enrol in primary school around the age of 6. The curriculum in primary education is determined by county school system. The school district selects curriculum guides and textbooks that reflect a state's learning standards and benchmarks for a given grade level. There are two types of primary education accessible in Botswana. The government provides education that is generally referred to as 'Setswana medium', the medium of instruction being Setswana as well as English. The private sector provides education whereby the language of instruction is purely English, these schools are referred to as 'English medium schools'.

Secondary Education 

Secondary education ranges from form 1 up to form 5 (junior secondary: form 1—form 3; senior secondary: form 4—form 5).

Students are usually given more independence, moving to different classrooms for different subjects, and being allowed to choose some of their class subjects (electives). The first three years of secondary education leads to the Junior Certificate, and after two more years of studying students sit for the Botswana General Certificate of Secondary Examination.

Higher education 
The University of Botswana, Botho University, Limkokwing University of Creative Technology, Ba Isago University,  ABM University College, Botswana International University of Science and Technology, Botswana Open University, Botswana University of Agriculture and Natural Resources, Gaborone University College of Law and professional Studies, and Gaborone Institute Of Professional Studies are the institutions that offer university education in the country. The University of Botswana is the national university which was established in 1982 by an act of parliament and is headquartered at Gaborone.

Localization of the curriculum 
Soon after independence it was realized that the educational system did not meet the needs of the nation. It was highly focused on academics and still had colonial hangovers. Many of the things taught were not relevant to the African context, thus the school drop-out rates were high. It was soon realized that change was needed.The leaders envisioned an education system that provided access to all and supported social harmony after the realization that the Botswana community was isolated according to different ethnic groups.  In 1977 a commission appointed by the government of Botswana published a report on educational reform: 'education for kagisano' (meaning 'education for social harmony').This first National Policy on Education (NPE) of 1977 was a reaction by Botswana leaders to move away from the British colonization model of learning to a more inclusive system when education was for the elite. As advised in the report, new core subjects were introduced into schools, making the education more relevant for Botswana. The education aimed to be more vocational in order to prepare students for the job market.

See also

 List of schools in Botswana
 Ministry of Education and Skills Development
 Ministry of Tertiary Education, Research, Science and Technology (Botswana)
 St. Joseph's College, Kgale

References

External links

Botswana Ministry of Education
Education Statistics and Quality of Education in Botswana, Southern and Eastern Africa Consortium for Monitoring Educational Quality
Literacy and education in Botswana bibliography
Information Communication Technology in Botswana (also contains general background information)
Profile of higher education in Botswana
Botswana's country profile on UNESCO-UNEVOC (Vocational Education)
The impact of HIV/AIDS on education in Botswana
Consortium for monitoring educational quality